The Gunman is a 1952 American Western film directed by Lewis D. Collins and starring Whip Wilson, Fuzzy Knight and Rand Brooks.

Cast
Whip Wilson as Whip Wilson 
Fuzzy Knight as Blinkey 
Rand Brooks as Jud Calvert 
Phyllis Coates as Anita Forester 
Terry Frost as Duke Kirby 
I. Stanford Jolley as Dan Forester 
Russ Whiteman as Sheriff Hanley 
Robert Bray as Tom Jamison 
Lane Bradford as Jack Gatlin - henchman 
Gregg Barton as Bill Longley - henchman 
Richard Avonde as Curt Blake - henchman

References

External links

1952 Western (genre) films
American Western (genre) films
Films directed by Lewis D. Collins
Monogram Pictures films
American black-and-white films
Films scored by Raoul Kraushaar
1950s English-language films
1950s American films